Oliver Marach and Alexander Peya were the defending champions but decided not to participate together.
Marach was to partner Daniele Bracciali but withdrew before the tournament, while Peya played alongside Nenad Zimonjić, but lost in the quarterfinals.
David Marrero and Fernando Verdasco won the title by beating Rogério Dutra da Silva and Daniel Muñoz de la Nava 6–4, 6–3 in the final.

Seeds

Draw

Draw

References
 Main Draw

International German Open - Doubles
2012 International German Open